Bernwiller is a commune in the Haut-Rhin department in north-eastern France. On 1 January 2016, the former commune Ammertzwiller was merged into Bernwiller.

See also
 Communes of the Haut-Rhin department

References

Communes of Haut-Rhin